Amandus Heinrich Christian Zietz (13 June 1840 – 2 August 1921) was a zoologist and paleontologist born in Hamburg, Schleswig-Holstein, and best known for his work at the South Australian Museum in Adelaide, after arriving in South Australia in 1883.

He and his son Frederick Robert Zietz, also a zoologist, worked on preserving bones from a diprotodon skeleton.
Along with E. C. Stirling, also at the South Australian museum, he undertook the direction of the first major palaeontology excavation at Lake Callabonna, where a large series of Diprotodont skeletal material was collected. 
Zietz was responsible for identifying a hitherto unknown species of shark from Investigator Strait, which became known as Asymbolus vincenti, or Gulf catshark.

He is buried in West Terrace Cemetery in Adelaide.

Works
His publications include:

References

Australian zoologists
1840 births
1921 deaths